Sgt. Kabukiman N.Y.P.D. is a 1990 American superhero comedy film directed by Lloyd Kaufman and Michael Herz and distributed by Troma Entertainment.

Plot 

The film follows Sergeant Detective Harry Griswold, a clumsy N.Y.P.D. cop investigating a string of murders involving kabuki actors. While attending an amateur kabuki play, Harry witnesses thugs gun down the entire cast. In the ensuing gunfight, Harry is forcibly kissed by one of the dying actors, unknowingly becoming blessed with the powers of kabuki. Before he knows it, Griswold finds out that he has the ability to transform into Kabukiman, a colorfully dressed slapstick superhero who has the ability to fly and access to such unique weapons as heat seeking chopsticks and fatal sushi.

With the assistance of the beautiful Lotus, he helps clean up the crime-ridden streets of New York and try to stop maniacal businessman Reginald Stuart and his Goons, who plan to fulfill an ancient evil prophecy that will summon The Evil One whose demonic powers can enslave the world.

Cast

Production 
While filming The Toxic Avenger Part II in Japan, where the first Toxic Avenger film had been a major hit, Kaufman and Herz were approached by Tetsu Fujimura and Masaya Nakamura of Namco to create a kabuki-themed superhero film, supposedly based on an idea by Kaufman. Namco became a producer, giving Troma a $1.5 million dollar budget to begin preproduction. The film was partially underwritten by the Japanese company Gaga Communications Inc.

At a total of $4 million, Sgt. Kabukiman N.Y.P.D. was Troma's most expensive film at the time of its production. A kabuki theater was constructed at Stevens Institute in Hoboken, New Jersey, for the film. Shooting took place in Hoboken, as well as in Manhattan and Brooklyn, New York.

Creative differences troubled production from the start; both Namco and Herz wanted a mainstream-accessible film geared towards children, whereas Kaufman wanted the usual Troma-esque sex and violence style. The film was eventually cut into both PG-13 and R-rated versions.

Release 
Sgt. Kabukiman N.Y.P.D. premiered at the American Film Institute in 1990. Although Kaufman screened Kabukiman at the Cannes Film Festival for several years, the film did not see theatrical distribution until 1996, when the PG-13 cut was exhibited.

Reception 
Stephen Holden, writing for The New York Times, called the film "funny in a Mad Magazine-manque sort of way", and concluded: "Is Sergeant Kabukiman a movie that bashes the Japanese? Of course it is. But the punishment it metes out is about as vicious as administering 40 lashes with a wet sesame noodle." A reviewer for the New York Daily News gave the film a score of two-and-a-half stars, writing that, "Amid the effluvia-driven slapstick, gross-out gags, fat jokes and cheerfully cheesy FX, Sgt. Kabukiman offer some legitimately funny sequences. And it benefits from Gianasi's likeable, physically adept performance."

In 2010, Sgt. Kabukiman was included in the book 150 Movies You Should Die Before You See by Steve Miller, who wrote that, "although it's technically one of Lloyd Kaufman's best pictures — he actually had a budget for special effects this time — his attempt to be both mild and spicy means it ends up being mostly bland." Gene Siskel and Roger Ebert reviewed it on their TV show in 1996, though it's not clear whether they had seen the R-rated or PG-13 versions (the recap at the end of the episode did not list any rating for the film). They gave it two thumbs down, with Roger liking it more than Gene, but both men agreeing it was a poorly-made exploitation film that was mildly amusing but not something they'd recommend to viewers.

Legacy 
Since the film's video debut in 1990, Sgt. Kabukiman has gone on to make several appearances in the "Tromaverse", becoming one of the company's most well-known mascots next to The Toxic Avenger. Kabukiman (played by Paul Krymse in a simpler costume) can be seen in a number of Troma commercials and video introductions throughout the 1990s. Most notably, Kabukiman was one of the prominent figures on Troma's Edge TV, where he appeared in a short parody of old public service announcement films, entitled Sgt. Kabukiman Public Service Announcement, directed by former Troma employee James Gunn.

Plans for a Sgt. Kabukiman N.Y.P.D. animated series also went into the works, however the series never went to production. An animated teaser was completed and has since been made available as a bonus feature on the Sgt. Kabukiman N.Y.P.D. DVD. The cartoon was to feature the Kabukiman character, and a number of Japanese themed super-heroes fighting crime in New York, with similar parallels to Troma's other animated spin-off, Toxic Crusaders.

Kabukiman makes an appearance in 2001's Citizen Toxie: The Toxic Avenger IV, played once again by Paul Kyrmse. In Citizen Toxie, Kabukiman has gone "from a serious superhero to a pathetic, drunken has-been who is looked upon with disdain by the citizens of Tromaville", states film critic Chris Gore. This change in character persona is attributed to fan backlash from the original film. Kabukiman is also portrayed as "Evil Kabukiman" in an alternate universe: a less wacky, more threatening villain.

Since 2000, there have been rumors that a sequel, Sgt. Kabukiman L.A.P.D., would be made, but as of 2010, there are no plans to revive the series. A sequel/spin-off called Sgt. Kabukiman and the Lesbians of Bonejack High started production in early 2006, but was ultimately never finished.

Kabukiman makes an appearance in the upcoming Return to the Class of Nuke 'Em High alongside the Toxic Avenger in a party scene as a tribute to his similar cameo in Tromeo & Juliet from 1996.

Kabukiman appeared in the "We Are All Made of Stars" music video by Moby in 2002 with the Toxic Avenger, signing an autograph for Leelee Sobieski.

Most recently, in 2015 the character has returned to host a talk show for the TromaMovies YouTube channel called "Kabukiman's Cocktail Corner" where he interviews and interacts with a variety of performance artists including musicians (Unicorn Smack, The Cowmen, Circus Life) comedians (Dave Hill, Zac Amico, Brian Quinn), authors (Frank Casesse), tattoo artists (Paul Booth) and more. A first season has been completed and a second series is in production. The character is played by Doug Sakmann, who was passed the Kabuki-mantle from Paul Kyrmse in 2001.

The car flip
Footage of the car chase scene in Sgt. Kabukiman N.Y.P.D., which ends with a car flipping and exploding, was re-used in the 1997 Troma film Tromeo and Juliet. This was done not only for cost-effective reasons, but also because Kabukiman had yet to be widely distributed on video (and thus brought some confusion as to which film the footage originated).

Despite obvious continuity flaws, Troma has managed to fit the same footage into each of their films as a tongue-in-cheek homage, including Terror Firmer, Citizen Toxie: The Toxic Avenger IV, Poultrygeist, Return to Nuke 'Em High Volume 1 and #Shakespeare'sShitstorm. It also appeared at the end (along with a cameo by Lloyd Kaufman) of the 2011 Xbox Kinect video game The Gunstringer.

References

External links 
 
  Sgt. Kabukiman N.Y.P.D. at the Troma Entertainment film database

1990 films
American action comedy films
American superhero films
1990s English-language films
1990 action comedy films
Films set in New York City
Kabukiman
Films about the New York City Police Department
Fictional portrayals of the New York City Police Department
Film superheroes
Kabuki
1990s police comedy films
Troma Entertainment films
Films directed by Lloyd Kaufman
1990s superhero comedy films
1990s American films